Kang Kyŏng-ae (20 April 1906 – 26 April 1944)  (姜敬愛) was a Korean writer, novelist and poet involved with the Feminist movement. She is also known by her penname Kang Gama.

Life
Kang Kyŏng-ae was born in Songhwa, Hwanghae-do, and had an unhappy childhood.  She was the daughter of a servant and lost her father at the age of five. She was then forced to move to Changyeon where her mother remarried a man with three children. All of these circumstances resulted in substantial unhappiness.

Kang was something of a prodigy and started teaching herself to read the Korean alphabet when she was eight years old using her step-father's copy of the Tale of Ch’unhyang at a time when female literacy was not greatly valued. By age ten, she had been nicknamed the “little acorn storyteller” by neighborhood elders for whom she read traditional Korean tales. She was also praised in school for her essay writing and often read stories for her friends.

Kang enrolled in a Catholic boarding school with the help of her brother-in-law. She was later expelled for orchestrating and participating in a sit-in against the school's strict policies and a particularly cruel dorm mistress. She met a college student who was visiting from Tokyo, moved to Seoul with him, and began an affair. When the affair ended, she moved back to her family home in Hwanghae-do.

In 1931 Kang began publishing her writing ("P'ag ŭm" or Broken Zither, 1931),  and moved to Manchuria as a newlywed, married to a communist who had divorced his first wife.  She lived as a housewife in Yongjin and began to churn out literary works. This period lasted seven years after which Kang ceased writing fiction altogether. This was partly related to the fact that she became the managing editor of the Manchurian Chosun Ilbo.

On April 26, 1944, one month after her mother died, Kang Kyŏng-ae died at her home in Hwanghae Province.

Work

Kang is often mentioned by literary critics as one of the foremost female writers of the colonial period. Different from other prominent female authors of the time, such as Na Hye-sok and Heo Jong-suk, she focused solely on fiction and essay writing and did not branch out into other forms of artistic expression such as painting.  She produced works focusing on the Korean underclass often based on her experiences with extremely poor Koreans in Manchuria, where many of her works took place. These include: "The Broken Geomungo" (Pageum), "Vegetable Garden" (Chaejeon), "Football Game" (Chukgu jeon), and "Mother and Child" (Moja). She also wrote proto-feminist works focusing on women's oppression including "Mothers and Daughters". Most of her works are anti-love/anti family, in which only those women who cut their ties with their failed relationships can achieve freedom.

From Wonso Pond (Ingan munje), which many consider her best work, is her only novel and deals with a multiplicity of class and gender issues.

Works in English
From Wŏnso Pond (Feminist Press 2009) 

The Underground Village (Honford Star 2018)

Works in Korean
The Broken Geomungo (Pageum 1931)
Mothers and Daughters ( 1931)
Comet (Hyeseong 1931)
The Front Line (Jaeilseon 1932) 
Vegetable Garden (Chaejeon 1933)
Football Game (Chukgu jeon 1933)
Existence, Nonexistence (Yumu 有無 1933)
Fathers and Sons (Buja 1934)
The Human Problem (Ingan munje 1934) 
Salt  (Sogeum 1934)
Drugs/Magic Medicine (Mayak) 
Mother and Child (Moja 1935)
Writer's Fee: 200 won (Wongoryo Ibaekwon 1935)
Layoff (Haego 1935)
Underground Village (Jihachon 1936)
Mountain Man (Sannam 1936)
Darkness (Eodum 1937)

See also 
List of women writers
List of Korean novelists

References

External links
 억압받는 하층여성을 대변하는 식민지시기 최고의 소설가 - 강경애 
 {{usurped|1=[이영아의 여론 女論]}} 강경애가 경성 문단을 떠난 이유 중앙일보 2012.06.04 
 [한국의 여성운동가들 5] 강경애 
 "3월 문화인물 소설가 강경애는 김좌진장군 암살교사범 동거녀" 조선일보 2005.01.17 
 강경애(1907-1943) 여성문제를 인간문제로 파악한 문학인 

1907 births
Korean writers
Korean novelists
Korean women poets
1944 deaths
20th-century novelists
20th-century Korean poets
20th-century women writers
Pseudonymous women writers
20th-century pseudonymous writers